André Luis da Costa Alfredo (born 21 April 1997), known as André Luis, is a Brazilian professional footballer who plays as a forward for Jeonbuk Hyundai Motors.

Club career
In 2020, André Luis joined Daejeon Hana Citizen FC on loan. In June of that year, both clubs announced the permanent transfer of André Luis to the Korean side, but after failing to pay the transfer fee, he subsequently joined Shanghai Greenland Shenhua and was loaned to Daejeon for the remainder of the season.

In 2021, however, Corinthians announced the return of André Luis after Shenhua also did not pay the transfer fee of the player. On 26 March, he moved to fellow first division side Atlético Goianiense on loan for the remainder of the year.

Honours
Corinthians
Campeonato Paulista: 2019

References

External links

1997 births
Living people
Brazilian footballers
Association football forwards
Campeonato Brasileiro Série A players
Campeonato Brasileiro Série B players
Campeonato Brasileiro Série C players
Club Athletico Paranaense players
Guaratinguetá Futebol players
Brasília Futebol Clube players
Santa Cruz Futebol Clube players
Cianorte Futebol Clube players
Associação Atlética Ponte Preta players
Sport Club Corinthians Paulista players
Atlético Clube Goianiense players
K League 1 players
Daejeon Hana Citizen FC players
Jeonbuk Hyundai Motors players
Brazilian expatriate footballers
Brazilian expatriate sportspeople in South Korea
Expatriate footballers in South Korea